The 1000 m speed skating is skated over two and a half laps on a 400 m rink, and three on a 333.3 m rink. On a 400 m rink it is the only distance that uses another finish line than other distances, while on the 333.3 m rink the distance has a common start- and finish line.

History

1930s: Recognition 
The history of the world record 1000 m speed skating for women starts in 1931, when the ISU (then still called IEV, Internationale Eislauf Vereinigung) decides to recognize records for women. The first official world record to be recognized was the 2:16.4 of Zofia Nehringowa from Poland, skated on 26 January 1929, in Warsaw, though at least two female Soviet skaters are known to have skated faster before 1929, Ljudmila Aleksejeva skated 1:57.6 in 1928, and later a 1:56.5 in 1930. However, because the Soviet Union was not a member of the ISU, their results could not be ratified.

The next record to be recognised by the ISU was the 2:08.8 of Austrian figure- and speed skater Liselotte Landbeck, skated on 10 January 1932, in Davos, which Zofia Nehringowa a week later in Engelberg improved to 2:03.4, still above the results of Aleksejeva. The first skater that set a world's best performance together with her official world record was the Norwegian Synnøve Lie, who skated 1:51.2 at the end of the 1931/32 season in Brandbu.

The first woman below 1:50.0 was Liselotte Landbeck, who skated a 1:48.5 on 22 January 1933 in Davos, which Synnøve Lie a year later improved on the same rink to 1:48.1. This soon proved not fast enough, as Verné Lesche from Finland set the record to 1:45.7 a month later, during the unofficial Women's World Allround Speed Skating Championships of 1934 in Oslo. At the end of the 1934/35 season that time fell to U.S. speed skater Kit Klein, who skated a 1:42.3 in Kongsberg. The next woman to improve the world record, Laila Schou Nilsen, brought the record down to 1:38.8 during the Women's World Allround Speed Skating Championships of 1937 in Davos.

1950s: Slow improvement 
The 1:38.8 proved to be a tough nut to crack, and it took till 5 February 1951 before Soviet speed skater Sofya Kondakova managed to skate 1:36.8 on the Medeo rink in Alma Ata, the Soviet Union meanwhile being a member of the ISU. In the years that followed three other Soviet skaters brought the record lower: Rimma Zhukova 1:36.6 in 1952, Lidia Selikova 1:36.4 in 1953 and Tamara Rylova 1:33.4 in 1955.

1960s: Artificial ice 
The 1960s saw a first technological breakthrough in speed skating: the 400 m artificial ice rink. The first world record 1000 m speed skating women on artificial ice was skated by Soviet speed skater Lidia Skoblikova, who skated a 1:31.8 during the Women's World Allround Speed Skating Championships of 1963 in Karuizawa. The next records would bring the 1:30.0 limit in sight, as Stien Kaiser of the Netherlands skated a 1.31.0 on the artificial ice of Inzell on 3 March 1968 and Elly van der Brom of the Netherlands skated a 1:30.0 on the natural ice of Davos on 9 February 1969.

1970s: Acceleration 
The 1970s saw a second technological breakthrough in the form of the skin suit, though that came only into general use by 1976. The 1970s saw a faster improvement than the decades before, beginning with Soviet skater Lyudmila Titova, who was the first woman below 1:30.0 with her 1:29.5 on 9 January 1970 on the Medeo rink, a record that stood only a day because Lyudmila Fechina skated 1:29.0 the next day of the same event. This result was equalled next year by Stien Kaiser on 16 January 1971 in Davos and by Lyudmila Titova during day one of the World Sprint Speed Skating Championships for Women 1971 in Inzell. A day later however Lyudmila Titova made the record her own again when she skated a 1:27.7. The last skater who set the world record on natural ice was U.S. skater Anne Henning, who managed a 1:27.3 on 8 January 1972 in Davos. Medeo by now had an artificial rink, and the next records of the 1970s would be skated here by Soviet skater Tatyana Averina: 1:26.40 in 1974, and 1:26.12, 1:25.28 and 1:23.46 in 1975.

1980s: Indoor rinks 
The 1980s saw a third technological breakthrough in the form of the indoor 400 m rink, though the first major races were not on indoor ice before 1987. The first 1000 m record of the decade, 1:23.01, was skated by Soviet skater Natalya Petrusyova on the Medeo rink at the end of the 1979/80 season. A year later Christa Rothenburger of East Germany improved that to 1:20.95, also on the Medeo rink, only to lose it a day later again to Natalya Petrusyova, when she managed a 1:20.81.

At the end of the 1982/83 season Natalya Petrusyova became the first woman to skate below 1:20.00, when she skated a 1:19.31 on the Medeo rink. The last woman to set a world record on outdoor ice was Karin Kania of East Germany, when she skated a 1:18.84 during the World Sprint Speed Skating Championships for Women of 1986 in Karuizawa. She would also be the first to skate a 1000 m world record indoor: 1:18.11 on 5 December 1987 in Calgary. During the 1988 Winter Olympics, Christa Rothenburger brought the record lower still with 1:17.65.

1990s: The clap skate 
The 1990s saw a fourth technological breakthrough, the clap skate, though that only came into general use at the end of the decade. But when it arrived, faster times became possible. Catriona Le May Doan of Canada was the first woman to skate a world record 1000 m for women on clap skates when she skated a 1:16.07 on 22 November 1997 in Calgary. U.S. skater Chris Witty would improve that twice during that season, from 1:15.43 to 1:14.96, while Monique Garbrecht of Germany skated 1:14.61 on 21 February 1999 during the World Sprint Speed Skating Championships for Women of 1999 in Calgary.

From 2000: Higher and faster 
During the last decades it has become evident that world records on the 1000 m for women can only be broken on (indoor) highland rinks. The last lowland record was set in 1935, the last outdoor record in 1986. Later world records were set at altitude in Calgary, and from 2002 the even higher indoor rink of Salt Lake City came into use. Monique Garbrecht was the first to skate a world record 1000 m for women there with 1:14.13, followed by Sabine Völker from Germany with 1:14.06 and Chris Witty with 1:13.83. The role of Calgary was not over yet, the next records were for Cindy Klassen of Canada with 1:13.46 and 1:13.11 during the 24/25 March 2006 Calgary Olympic Oval final and Christine Nesbitt of Canada skated 1:12.68 during the World Sprint Speed Skating Championships for Women of 2012 in Calgary.

The world record progression as recognised by the International Skating Union

References

Notes

Bibliography

 Bijlsma, Hedman with Tom Dekkers; Alex Dumas; Arie van Erk; Gé du Maine; Hans Niezen and Karel Verbeek. Schaatsseizoen '81-'82: 10e Jaargang, statistische terugblik. Franeker, the Netherlands: Stichting Schaatsseizoen, 1982.
 Bijlsma, Hedman with Tom Dekkers; Arie van Erk; Gé du Maine; Hans Niezen; Nol Terwindt and Karel Verbeek. Schaatsseizoen '96-'97: 25e Jaargang 1996-1997, statistische terugblik. Assen, the Netherlands: Stichting Schaatsseizoen, 1997. .
 Eng, Trond. All Time International Championships, Complete Results: 1889 - 2002. Askim, Norway: WSSSA-Skøytenytt, 2002.

External links
 Historical World Records International Skating Union.
 

World 01000 women